El Día is a Chilean newspaper based in La Serena serving the Coquimbo Region.

History
El Día was founded by Pedro Vega Gutiérrez on April 1, 1944, with 1,200 copies of the first edition sold from a building at the corner of Calle Los Carrera and Calle Brasil in the center of La Serena. Antonio Puga Rodríguez acquired the newspaper in 1959, and his family continues to own it through the company, Antonio Puga y Cía Ltda. As of 2015, El Día had an estimated 55,000 daily readers.

References

External links
El Día en Internet (online edition)

Newspapers published in Chile
Mass media companies of Chile
Spanish-language newspapers
Publications established in 1944
1944 establishments in Chile